Johann Jacob Zschach (1737 Leipzig - 1809) was a German naturalist and entomologist. He was a professor in Leipzig and Marburg and  the curator of the Museum Leskeanum.

Works
Zschach, J. J. 1788: Museum N. G. Leskeanum. Pars Entomologica ad systema entomologiae Cl. Fabricii ordinata cura I. I. Zschachii, M. Bacc. - Lipsiae, I. G. Müller [2]+136 p., 3 col. Taf. 
A systematic list of the specimens contained in the Leske Museum in which new Coleoptera and Lepidoptera were described by Zschach. New species of Diptera were numbered, but not given names. Johann Friedrich Gmelin's 13th edition of Linnaeus' Systema Naturae (1788-1793) gave these new species Latin binomial names and the other new species were described again.

References
Evenhuis, N. L. 1997: Litteratura taxonomica dipterorum (1758-1930). Volume 1 (A-K); Volume 2 (L-Z). 1; 2 Leiden, Backhuys Publishers, VII+1-426; 427-871 S., pp. 841–842, Schr.verz.
Reinhardt, R. 2014: Verstorbene Entomologen Sachsens - Stand: Dezember 2013. Mitteilungen Sächsischer Entomologen, Mittweida 33 (107), S. 47-56.
Vane-Wright, R.I., 1975  The Butterflies named by J.F.Gmelin (Lepidoptera: Rhopalocera) Bulletin of the Natural History Museum: Entomology Volume: 32(02) : 17-64  BM(NH) Illustrations : 6 plates pdf

German entomologists
1737 births
1809 deaths